Suhani Gandhi is a British actress and beauty pageant titleholder of Indian descent.

She was crowned Miss India UK in January 2014. She had finished 2nd runner-up at Miss India Europe 2014. She placed in the top 5 at Miss India Worldwide 2014.

Early life and education
Suhani was born and brought up in Bedford, England. Her parents, Mukul Gandhi and Asmita Gandhi, are both Chartered Accountants. Suhani completed her schooling at Bedford Modern School and graduated with a law degree from the University of Birmingham and a Masters from Imperial College London.

Career 
Although naturally inclined towards her studies, Suhani modelled as a child and young teenager in the UK. She trained part-time for five years at LAMDA (London Academy of Music Drama and Arts), receiving a distinction in the gold medal for acting. Thereafter, she undertook theatre workshops and performed in theatre productions in England and Mumbai. Suhani was nominated by Times Now for the NRI of the Year Award.

She starred in a film based in Rajasthan as the protagonist, in which she received the Best Debut Award at the Rajasthan Cine Awards and Best Actress at the Rajasthan Film Festival. The film is based on women empowerment and education which released on 21 November 2014.

She has starred in various TV Commercials, including Margo, Dubai Tourism, Tanishq, Vivo, Xolo, Ease My Trip, Britannia, Heineken. She has acted in Aparichit which was selected as the Top 5 short films in the Best of India Film Festivals in LA and made it to the Oscars Longlist. Her short film Seasons, won 4 awards at the 7th Darbhanga International Film Festival. Suhani was also seen in Jab Harry Met Sejal, Arjun Patiala and the television film Love.

Suhani is starring as 'Adilah Farhani' in the Portuguese series Fernao Lopes premiering in 2021 on RTP1 and Netflix where she has been paired opposite Diogo Morgado.

Filmography

References

External links
Miss India UK
CV at the Alan Sharman Agency

Living people
People educated at Bedford Modern School
Year of birth missing (living people)